The 1981 Sugar Bowl was the 47th edition of the college football bowl game, played at the Louisiana Superdome in New Orleans, Louisiana, on Thursday, January 1. Part of the 1980–81 bowl game season, it matched the undefeated and top-ranked Georgia Bulldogs of the Southeastern Conference, and the seventh-ranked Notre Dame Fighting Irish. A slight underdog, Georgia won, 17–10.

Teams

Georgia

Notre Dame

Game summary
The game kicked off shortly after 1 p.m. CST, televised by ABC, at the same time as the Cotton Bowl on CBS.

In the first quarter, Notre Dame scored first on a 50-yard Harry Oliver field goal. Another Notre Dame scoring opportunity in the first quarter was foiled when Bulldog freshman Terry Hoage blocked a field goal.  Hoage had been a last-minute addition to the roster by head coach Vince Dooley for his kick blocking ability. Due to good field position Georgia's Rex Robinson would eventually boot a 46-yard field goal of his own to tie the game at three.

On the ensuing kickoff, a communication gaffe between the Irish's deep return players resulted in neither one fielding the kick which bounced at the one-yard line and was recovered by Georgia's Bob Kelly. Two plays later, Bulldog running back Herschel Walker scored on a one-yard touchdown run as Georgia led 10–3. In the second quarter, Walker scored on a three-yard run making the score 17–3 at halftime.

The only score in the second half came in the third quarter; Notre Dame scored on a one-yard run to close the margin to 17–10. Georgia's defense held on to that lead, giving Georgia the victory and the 1980 national championship.

True freshman Walker rushed for 150 yards and was named Sugar Bowl MVP. Bulldog defensive back Scott Woerner made several key plays throughout the day including a late game interception that sealed  Georgia was first in both final polls.

Scoring
First quarter
Notre Dame – Harry Oliver 50-yard field goal
Georgia – Rex Robinson 46-yard field goal
Georgia – Herschel Walker 1-yard run (Robinson kick)
Second quarter
Georgia – Walker 2-yard run (Robinson kick)
Third quarter
Notre Dame  – Phil Carter 1-yard run (Oliver kick)
Fourth quarter
No scoring

Statistics
{| class=wikitable style="text-align:center"
! Statistics !! Georgia !! Notre Dame
|-
|First downs ||10||17
|-
|Rushing yards||52–120||50–190
|-
|Passing yards||7||138
|-
|Passing ||1–13–0 ||12–28–3
|-
|Total offense ||65–127||78–328
|-
|Punts–average ||11–38.5||5–42.0
|-
|Fumbles–lost ||0–0||1–1
|-
|Turnovers||0||4
|-
|Penalties–yards ||6–32||8–69
|}

Note
This Sugar Bowl marked the debut of Georgia's costumed mascot Hairy Dawg.

Georgia native President Jimmy Carter was in attendance, three weeks before leaving office.

References

Sugar Bowl
Sugar Bowl
Georgia Bulldogs football bowl games
Notre Dame Fighting Irish football bowl games
Sugar Bowl
Sugar Bowl